Ichoria semiopaca is a moth of the subfamily Arctiinae. It was described by Paul Dognin in 1906. It is found in Brazil (São Paulo).

References

 Natural History Museum Lepidoptera generic names catalog

Arctiinae
Moths described in 1906